Mahant Swami Pratap Puri ji (born 14 April 1964) is an Indian spiritual leader and politician who is the current head of Taratara math. He is a resident of Mahabar village in Barmer district in western Rajasthan, India. He is very active in social media.

Early life and education 
He completed his initial education in Leelsar village and Barmer. He took his major education in Sastra section from the Gurukul in cheshire district in Haryana. He was handed over to his guru Mohan Puri Ji at very early age by his parents. He completed his studies and devoted himself in meditation and working for the sanatana Hindu dharma. His speeches highlight the need for social unity, women empowerment and scientific mindset on social media.

Politics 
He contested in the Rajasthan Assembly election 2018 from Pokhran on Bharathiya Janata Party's ticket. He got defeated by a narrow margin of votes to Congress Politician Shale Mohammad . Presently he is actively involved in the areas of spiritual preaching and politics as well.

References 

महंत प्रताप पूरी जी महाराज क्यो आए राजनीति मे

Indian Hindu spiritual teachers
21st-century Hindu religious leaders
1964 births
Indian Hindu monks
Hindu tantra
Living people